Dmitry Yuryevich Grigorenko (born 14 July 1978) is a Russian politician serving as Deputy Prime Minister of the Russian Federation and Chief of the Government Staff assumed office in January 2020.

He was born Nizhnevartovsk, Tyumen Region. He graduated from the Kuban State University and Institute of economy at the Kuban institute of the international entrepreneurship and management in the specialty specialized in finance.

Career 
He works in Tax inspection in 2000 as a specialist, chief of state tax inspector of Interregional inspectorate for the largest tax payers and was later transferred to Ministry of Taxes and Collection in 2003 working as chief of the state tax inspector of summary analysis department of Department of taxation of profit, he also works at the Federal Tax Service as deputy chief of analysis department, head of department of taxation of commercial organizations and tax accounting of Management of taxation of profit till 2008 where he was made head of the department of administration income tax of commercial organizations and tax accounting of the Management of administration tax income till 2012 he was head of department of income tax and special tax modes and in 2013 he was head of department of taxation in Federal Tax Service and was later deputy manager the Federal Tax Service from October 2013 before he became the deputy prime minister and head of government federation in January 2020.

In May 2020 he joined the supervisory board of VTB replacing Anton Siluanov in the second biggest bank of Russia, a position he is to assumed in September 2020.

In February 2022, Gigorenko was put on the European Union sanctions list for being "responsible for providing financial and material support, and benefitting from Russian decision-makers responsible for the annexation of Crimea or the destabilisation of Eastern Ukraine."

In May 2022, the United States Department of the Treasury placed sanctions on Gigorenko pursuant to  "for being or having been a leader, official, senior executive officer, or member of the board of directors of the [Government of Russia]."

Notes 

1978 births
Living people
Russian politicians
People from Tyumen
Kuban State University alumni